Kenas or Kannas may refer to:
 Kenas-e Olya
 Kenas-e Sofla

See also
 Kanna (disambiguation)